Raevyn Rogers (born September 7, 1996) is an American middle-distance athlete. She won a bronze medal in the 800 meters at the 2020 Tokyo Olympics, becoming the fourth fastest woman in U.S. history in the event. At the 2019 World Championships, Rogers came from seventh with 100m remaining in the race to place silver over USA teammate Ajeé Wilson in bronze. She earned a world indoor title as a member of national 4x400 m relay squad that took gold at the 2018 World Indoor Championships.

Rogers ran on the University of Oregon Ducks women's track and field team until 2017, when she went professional.

Athletic career

High school
Rogers attended The Kinkaid School in Houston, Texas, where she competed for the Falcons. She earned a bronze medal in the 800 at the World Youth Championships in 2013, where she also ran on a medley relay that took gold. She still holds individual school records in the 200m, 400m, 800m and 1600m. She graduated in 2014.

University of Oregon
Rogers was a six-time NCAA Division I champion and ten-time All-American at University of Oregon. She won three consecutive outdoor 800 meters NCAA and Pac-12 Conference titles (2015, 2016, 2017) as well as the 2017 Women's Bowerman Award.

Rogers enjoyed a breakthrough season in her first spring with the Ducks. At the 2015 Penn Relays, Rogers ran the 400m leg of the Sprint Medley, which won the race in a time of 3:44.59, narrowly defeating Clemson University. Her win at the NCAA championships contributed 10 points to a total of 59 team points, which won the meet for Oregon for the first time since 1985. She also won the 800 at the 2015 Outdoor U.S. Junior Championships and the 2015 Pan American Junior Athletics Championships. In winning the 800-meter title at the 2015 NCAA Division I Outdoor Track and Field Championships, her time of 1:59.71 was the fastest ever run by a freshman, and the fourth-fastest run by a Duck.

Rogers produced a collegiate record at 800 meters in her third and final year with the Ducks, setting a time of 1:59.10 that smashed a 27-year-old record.

Subsequent years
She placed 4th in the 800 meters (2:00.75) at 2018 NACAC Championships in Toronto.

Rogers placed 2nd in the 800 meters at 2018 USA Outdoor Track and Field Championships at Drake University in Des Moines, Iowa.

She placed 1st in the 4 × 400 m (3:30.54 in the prelim) and 5th in the 800 m (2:01.44) at 2018 IAAF World Indoor Championships. Rogers placed 2nd in the 800 meters (2:01.74) behind champion Ajee' Wilson in Albuquerque, New Mexico, at 2018 USA Indoor Track and Field Championships.

Rogers was part of Team USA setting world indoor record in the 4 × 800 m relay February 3 at 2018 Millrose Games in 8:05.89 – Chrishuna Williams (2:05.10), Raevyn Rogers (2:00.45), Charlene Lipsey (2:01.98), Ajee' Wilson (1:58.37).

She competed in the women's 800 meters at the 2016 NACAC Under-23 Championships in Athletics, running 2:04.78 in the final round to earn fourth place.

Rogers competed in the women's 800 meters at the 2015 Pan American Junior Athletics Championships, running 2:04.62 in the final round to earn first place.

She competed in the women's 800 meters at the 2014 World Junior Championships in Athletics, running 2:08.01 in the preliminary round to rank No. 22 as a non-qualifying athlete.

Rogers competed in the women's 800 meters at the 2013 World Youth Championships in Athletics, running 2:03.32 in the final round to earn bronze medal.

Achievements

International competitions
Information taken from World Athletics profile.

US Track & Field Championships

University of Oregon
Sources.

Personal bests

References

External links

 
 University of Oregon Raevyn Rogers Profile
 Raevyn Rogers Athletic Profile
 

1996 births
Living people
African-American female track and field athletes
American female sprinters
Track and field athletes from Houston
World Athletics Championships athletes for the United States
Oregon Ducks women's track and field athletes
World Athletics Championships medalists
World Athletics Indoor Championships winners
Athletes (track and field) at the 2020 Summer Olympics
Medalists at the 2020 Summer Olympics
Olympic bronze medalists for the United States in track and field
21st-century African-American sportspeople
21st-century African-American women
The Kinkaid School alumni